Harrold is a surname in the English language. In some cases the name may be an Anglicised form of the Irish Ó hArailt.

People with the surname Harrold include:
 Arthur Harrold (1854–1908), businessman and politician in South Australia
 Bert Harrold (1898–1968), Australian Rules footballer in Western Australia
 Harrold Brothers, Australian merchants and shipping company
 Jimmy Harrold (1892–1950), English footballer
 John Harrold, mayor of Glendora, California
 Kathryn Harrold (born 1950), American actress
 Mary Jean Harrold (1947–2013) American computer scientist
 Orville Harrold (1878–1933), American operatic tenor and musical theatre actor
 Rowland Harrold (1865–1924), South Australian dermatologist
 Sid Harrold, English footballer
 Thomas Leonard Harrold (1902–1973), US Army officer
 William Harrold (born 1988), English professional golfer

See also 
 Harold (surname)
Surnames from given names

References

English-language surnames